Eupithecia indefinata is a moth in the family Geometridae. It is found in Colombia.

References

Moths described in 1874
indefinata
Moths of South America